Matt Feeney (born October 8, 1991) is an American football coach and former player. He is currently the defensive quality control coach  for the Las Vegas Raiders. Feeney was previously the defensive coordinator at the University of Akron and Chattanooga.

Playing career
Feeney played linebacker for John Carroll from 2010 through 2013, while completing his degree in Marketing, with a minor in entrepreneurship. He was a four-year letterwinner, and as a senior, he was awarded the Ohio Athletic Conference’s Gene Slaughter Most Outstanding Linebacker Award. He was also an All-Conference honoree, and well as a two time Conference Defensive Player of the week.

Coaching career

John Carroll

Following his playing career and graduation, Feeney immediately joined the coaching staff at John Carroll as the inside linebackers coach in 2014. The following season, Feeney added co-special teams coordinator responsibilities. This was all done as a graduate assistant while he was taking classes for a master’s degree.

Chattanooga

When John Carroll head coach Tom Arth was named the new head coach at Chattanooga, he brought Feeney with him. In 2017, Feeney was in charge of coaching the linebackers, and in 2018, he was promoted to defensive coordinator. He was only 26 years old.

Akron

In January 2019, it was announced that Feeney would be following Arth to Akron to again serve as the defensive coordinator and linebackers coach.

Western Illinois
After Arth was fired and the staff at Akron was released, Feeney joined new Western Illinois Leathernecks coach, Myers Hendrickson's staff as the defensive coordinator.

Las Vegas Raiders
He was hired as a defensive quality control coach under Raiders new head coach Josh McDaniels for his inaugural staff.

References

1991 births
Living people
American football linebackers
Akron Zips football coaches
Chattanooga Mocs football coaches
John Carroll Blue Streaks football coaches
John Carroll Blue Streaks football players
Las Vegas Raiders coaches